The Portuguese Colonial Act was adopted in 1930, and affected Portuguese India, sanctioning legal discrimination and differentiating them from the metropolitan Portuguese people. Adopted at the behest of António de Oliveira Salazar , then the Minnister of Finance, this legal act caused Portuguese Indians to lose a number of benefits, including free trips to Portugal for rest and recreation, reduced allowances compared to white officials, and other facilities that the white Portuguese had overseas which were not made available to Portuguese Indians.

The Act was repealed only in 1950, in part because of the contributions of Froilano de Mello, a Goan Catholic doctor and an independent member of parliament in Lisbon. He represented Goa in the Assembly of the Republic. He fought for the rights of Portuguese Indians. De Mello was so successful that, from 1950, Goans regained their status and were treated in equal terms like other Portuguese citizens from the metropolis.

References

Portuguese Empire
Portuguese India
Former Portuguese colonies
Portuguese people of colonial India
Government of Portugal
Repealed Portuguese legislation
1930 in law
1930 in Portugal
1930 in Portuguese India